Okayama Broadcasting Co., Ltd. (岡山放送株式会社) is a TV station broadcast in Okayama and Kagawa Prefectures.  The abbreviation, OHK stands for Okayama Hoso K. K., the corporate name in romaji.  It is a network affiliate of Fuji News Network (FNN) and Fuji Network System (FNS).  The callsign is JOOH-TV.

History
OHK as founded on March 26, 1968, and began broadcasting on April 1, 1969 as a primary FNN and secondary NET/ANN affiliate for the city of Okayama. KSB also began broadcasting on that same date as a primary NET/ANN affiliate for northern Kagawa Prefecture. On April 1, 1979, the Okayama and Kagawa television markets were merged with each other; OHK dropped its secondary affiliation with ANN as it was now able to serve both prefectures.

The station began broadcasting in digital on December 1, 2006, and terminated its analog transmissions on July 24, 2011.

Programs
FNN Speak (FNNスピーク)
OHK Prime News (OHKプライムニュース)
Hashire! Gulliver-kun → Go! Go! Gulliver-kun (走れ!ガリバーくん → Go! Go!ガリバーくん, end)

External links
OHK web 

Fuji News Network
Television stations in Japan
Television channels and stations established in 1969